Events in the year 1214 in Norway.

Incumbents
Monarch: Inge II of Norway

Events

Arts and literature

Births

Deaths
Haakon the Crazy, earl.

References 

Norway